Walter Kurt Wiemken (14 September 1907 – 30 December 1940) was a Swiss painter.

Life 
Walter Kurt Wiemken was born in Basel in 1907 to German parents who had gained Swiss citizenship in 1898. He  became seriously ill with polio at the age of four months, which led to a lifelong disability. He lived in his parents' home until his death and also built his art studio there. His father owned a lithography business.

He studied at the vocational school in Basel from 1923 to 1927, where his graphics teacher was the painter Fritz Baumann, the founder of the Expressionist art group Das neue Leben (The new life).

In 1927, he spent the summer semester at the State University of Applied Arts in Munich, where he was taught by Fritz Helmuth Ehmcke and Richard Klein. After his stay in Munich, he travelled to Paris with the painter Otto Abt, where he created his last Expressionist pictures. These were almost exclusively gloomy street scenes. After this, he turned to Impressionism. During these trips he painted fantastic landscapes. He and his friends visited Collioure several times until 1939.

One day, he saw a young girl's burial taking place while a butcher was going about his daily work nearby. This had a strong effect on his creative output. From then on, he aimed to represent the dichotomy of these simultaneous events of human life in his paintings. In the 1930s his art was influenced by the work of Serge Brignoni, Kurt Seligmann and Pablo Picasso, who in turn had been influenced by Surrealism. His work was characterised as showing both the light and dark sides of humanity. In 1936 he took part in the exhibition "Zeitprobleme in der Schweizer Malerei und Plastik" ("Time-dependent problems in Swiss painting and sculpture") at the Kunsthaus Zürich.

In 1933 he co-founded the Gruppe 33 with his friends Abt and Bodmer, as a protest against conservative trends in Swiss art and architecture (especially in Basel). Gruppe 33 were also staunchly anti-fascist. From 1936 to 1937 he was influenced by his friend Bodmer's constructivist art.  He travelled to Belgium in 1937 and became interested in the surrealist art of James Ensor.

On 30 December 1940, he was reported missing after he went out alone for a walk. He had died from falling into the Breggia Gorge near Castel San Pietro and his corpse was not found until 23 January 1941.

He was internationally praised and exhibited and was one of the artists whose works were displayed at documenta 1 in Kassel (1955).

References
 Erinnerungen an Walter Kurt Wiemken von Walter  Bodmer und Otto Abt. Œvrekatalog von Helene Sartorius und Claus Krieg. Holbein, Basel 1942.
 Beat Wismer, Paul-André Jaccard: Werke des 20. Jahrhunderts – Von Cuno Amiet bis heute. Sammlungskatalog Aargauer Kunsthaus Aarau, Aarau 1983.
 Harald Szeemann (Ed.): Visionäre Schweiz im    Kunsthaus Zürich. Sauerländer, Aarau 1991, .
 
 
   This article was initially translated from the German Wikipedia.

External links

20th-century Swiss painters
Swiss male painters
1907 births
1940 deaths
Deaths from falls
20th-century Swiss male artists